is a railway station located in the city of  Hashima, Gifu Prefecture,  Japan, operated by the private railway operator Meitetsu.

Lines

Station layout
Hashima-shiyakusho-mae Station has one ground-level island platform connected by a level crossing. The station is staffed.

Platforms

Adjacent stations

History
It was named  on January 1, 1951, and became  in on April 1, 1959. It was renamed to its present name on December 11, 1982.

Surrounding area
Hashima City Hall
Hashima High School
Takehana Junior High School

See also
 List of Railway Stations in Japan

External links

  

Railway stations in Japan opened in 1929
Stations of Nagoya Railroad
Railway stations in Gifu Prefecture
Hashima, Gifu